Aadhyate Anubhavam is a 1987 Indian Malayalam film directed by Kashinath. It is the dubbed version of the Kannada movie Anubhava, directed by Kashinath himself.

Cast

 Kashinath as Ramesh
 Abhinaya as Gauri
 Umashree as Paddi
 Kaminidharan
 Master Vasanth
 Arvind
 Dinesh
 Shivraj
 Shivakumar

Soundtrack
All the songs are composed and scored by L. Vaidyanathan. Lyrics were by Poovachal Khader.

References

External links
 

1987 films
1980s Malayalam-language films
Films directed by Kashinath